Sándor Orbán (24 September 1947 – 19 March 2005) was a Hungarian boxer. He competed in the men's flyweight event at the 1976 Summer Olympics.

References

External links
 

1947 births
2005 deaths
Hungarian male boxers
Olympic boxers of Hungary
Boxers at the 1976 Summer Olympics
People from Kecskemét
Flyweight boxers
Sportspeople from Bács-Kiskun County
20th-century Hungarian people